Mohammad Lutfur Rahman (1889-1936), a Bengali author, was born in Magura District.

Life
Mohammad Lutfur Rahman, was a teacher and afterwards went to Kolkata and established a helping house for women named, ‘Naritirtha’. He published a magazine named Narishakti. Later, Mohammad Lutfur Rahman became a homeopathic doctor.

Writing career 
His literary works were included in the curriculum of school level, secondary, higher secondary and graduation level Bengali Literature in Bangladesh.

Self-development books
Unnoto Jibon
Manob Jibon
Mohot Jibon
Shotto Jibon
Uccho Jibon
Jubak Jibon
Dharmo Jibon
Cheleder Mohottokotha
Musolman
Mangal Vabishat
Priti Upohar
Bashor Upohar
Raihan
Pothohara
Uddom o Porishrrom

Poetry
Prokash

Translations
Chotoder Karbala
Don Quixote

References
Golpo Songroho (Collected Stories), the national textbook of B.A. (pass and subsidiary) course of Bangladesh, published by University of Dhaka in 1979 (reprint in 1986).
Bangla Sahitya (Bengali Literature), the national textbook of intermediate (college) level of Bangladesh published in 1996 by all educational boards.

Bengali writers
Bengali-language writers
20th-century Bengali poets
Bengali-language poets
1889 births
1936 deaths
20th-century Indian poets
Bengali male poets
Indian male poets
20th-century Indian male writers
People from Magura District

Bengali Muslims